The New York Senior Hurling Championship is an annual competition between hurling clubs affiliated with the New York GAA. Most Gaelic Athletic Association clubs are based on the counties of Ireland, though sometimes players will play with a different team in New York from their own county. The final is played in Gaelic Park in the Bronx. The winning team is presented with the Michael Flannery Cup. The 2022 champions are Waterford NY who defeated Hoboken Guards on a score of 6-17 to 2-25 after extra time.  Click here to read final report

Roll of Honour

List of Finals

References

External links
Irish Voice newspaper
https://gaanewyork.com/articles/75341
https://thelonghallpodcast.com/waterford-clinch-first-new-york-senior-hurling-title-after-gaelic-park-thriller/

Hurling 1 Championship